In thermodynamics, a physical property is any property that is measurable, and whose value describes a state of a physical system. Thermodynamic properties are defined as characteristic features of a system, capable of specifying the system's state. Some constants, such as the ideal gas constant, do not describe the state of a system, and so are not properties.

"Specific" properties are expressed on a per mass basis.  If the units were changed from per mass to, for example, per mole, the property would remain as it was (i.e., intensive or extensive).

Regarding work and heat

Work and heat are not thermodynamic properties, but rather process quantities: flows of energy across a system boundary. Systems do not contain work, but can perform work, and likewise, in formal thermodynamics, systems do not contain heat, but can transfer heat. Informally, however, a difference in the energy of a system that occurs solely because of a difference in its temperature is commonly called heat, and the energy that flows across a boundary as a result of a temperature difference is "heat".

Altitude (or elevation) is usually not a thermodynamic property.  Altitude can help specify the location of a system, but that does not describe the state of the system.  An exception would be if the effect of gravity need to be considered in order to describe a state, in which case altitude could indeed be a thermodynamic property.

See also
 Conjugate variables
 Dimensionless numbers
 Intensive and extensive properties
 Thermodynamic databases for pure substances
 Thermodynamic variable

References

Thermodynamic properties